Dominic Guard (born 18 June 1956) is an English child psychotherapist and author, formerly an actor.

Early life
Guard was born in London on 18 June 1956. His father, Philip Guard, was an English stage actor, his mother, Charlotte Mitchell, an actress and poet. His older brother Christopher, also an actor, was born in 1953. His parents separated when he was twelve. 
As a 14-year-old, in The Go-Between (1971), Guard played Leo Colston, the title character who runs messages between two secret lovers and has a momentous 13th birthday. For his performance he won a BAFTA award in 1971 as Most Promising Newcomer to Leading Film Roles. The film won the Palme d'Or, the main prize at the Cannes film festival.

Adult actor
Guard later appeared in Picnic at Hanging Rock (1975),  The Count of Monte Cristo (1975) with Richard Chamberlain, Absolution (1978) alongside Richard Burton and Billy Connolly, Gandhi (1982), and in P. D. James's An Unsuitable Job for a Woman alongside his cousin Pippa Guard.

In 1978 Guard voiced the role of Pippin in an animated adaptation of The Lord of the Rings. His brother Christopher Guard starred alongside him in the film, voicing Frodo Baggins. On stage he played Christopher in a 1982 production of The Jeweller's Shop by Karol Wojtyła, later Pope John Paul II, at the Westminster Theatre, and appeared in a guest role in the 1983 Doctor Who story Terminus. He continued acting regularly until 2000.

Later career
Guard is now a fully accredited child psychotherapist living in London and has written more than ten books for children, including "Little Box of Mermaid Treasures", "Pirate Fun", "The Dragon Master's Tale", and "Secrets of the Fairy Ring".

Personal life 
Guard is the father of two children with the actress Sharon Duce, with whom he appeared in Absolution (1978).

Work

Films
 The Go-Between (1971) - Leo Colston
 The Nelson Affair (1973) - George Matcham Jr. 
 Picnic at Hanging Rock  (1975) - Michael Fitzhubert
 The Count of Monte Cristo  (1975) - Albert Mondego
 Absolution  (1978) - Benjamin Stanfield
 One Fine Day (1979) - Rycroft
 An Unsuitable Job for a Woman (1982) - Andrew Lunn
 Gandhi (1982) - Subaltern
 L' Homme qui a perdu son ombre (The Man who Lost his Shadow) (1991) - Paul

Television
  The Hands of Cormac Joyce (Hallmark Hall of Fame) (1972) - Jackie Joyce 
 How Green Was My Valley (1976) - Huw Morgan
 Maybury (1981) - Colin Gilbert 
 Cousin Phillis (1982) - Paul Manning
 Terminus (Doctor Who) (1983) - Olvir
 The Hello Goodbye Man (1984) - Glen Harris
 A Woman of Substance (1984) - Winston Harte
 Big Deal (series 3) 'Playing the ace' & 'The biggest deal' (1986) - Simon
 All Creatures Great and Small S7.Ep4 'A Friend for Life (1990) - Peter Shadwell
 The Bill - S7.Ep79 'Friday and Counting  (1991) - Robin Granger
 Casualty - S6.E15 'Cascade'''  (1992) - Tim Turner
 The Gingerbread Girl (1993) - David
 The Bill - S10.Ep71 'Lesson to be Learned  (1994) - Vernon Meredith
 Casualty - S10.E11 'Release  (1995) - Philip Hall
 Wycliffe - S2.Ep6 Happy Families (1995) - Mick Brandon
 The Bill - S12.Ep147 'Black Money'  (1996) - Tony Baker
 Annie's Bar (1996) - Alistair Read
 Poirot -  S7.Ep2 Lord Edgware Dies (2000) - Bryan Martin

References

Bibliography
 Holmstrom, John. The Moving Picture Boy: An International Encyclopaedia from 1895 to 1995''. Norwich, Michael Russell, 1996, pp. 314–315.

External links

THE GO-BETWEEN - Interview With Dominic Guard, YouTube

1956 births
Living people
BAFTA Most Promising Newcomer to Leading Film Roles winners
English children's writers
English male film actors
English male television actors
English male voice actors
English psychologists